Idan Srur (born October 5, 1986) is an Israeli footballer who currently plays for Beitar Kfar Saba.

He is of a Tunisian-Jewish descent.

Career
Srur moved to Hapoel Tel Aviv youth ranks at the age of 15 and made it to the first team three years later. A two-year loan spell at Hapoel Petah Tikva ended with Srur signing a four-year contract with Hapoel Tel Aviv. After not making an impact with the first team, he was again loaned to Hapoel Kiryat Shmona and Hapoel Petah Tikva, his current team.

References

1986 births
Living people
Israeli Jews
Israeli footballers
Association football midfielders
Hapoel Tel Aviv F.C. players
Hapoel Petah Tikva F.C. players
Hapoel Ironi Kiryat Shmona F.C. players
Hapoel Ramat Gan F.C. players
F.C. Ashdod players
Hapoel F.C. Karmiel Safed players
Sektzia Ness Ziona F.C. players
Hapoel F.C. Ortodoxim Lod players
Hapoel Marmorek F.C. players
Maccabi Be'er Ya'akov F.C. players
Bnei Eilat F.C. players
Hapoel Hod HaSharon F.C. players
Beitar Kfar Saba F.C. players
Hapoel Bik'at HaYarden F.C. players
Beitar Petah Tikva F.C. players
Israeli Premier League players
Liga Leumit players
Israeli people of Tunisian-Jewish descent
Footballers from Ramla
Israel under-21 international footballers